New Hope High School is located in Columbus, Mississippi, US. It is part of the Lowndes County School District. The principal of the school as of 2013 is Matt Smith.

Demographics
In 2006–2007, New Hope's student body was White (non-Hispanic) 64%, Black (non-Hispanic) 35%, all others 1%.

Advanced Placement courses
New Hope offers a variety of Advanced Placement courses; a few examples are AP Biology, Statistics, Physics, and Calculus.

Languages and language programs
 Spanish I, II, and III

Sport programs
Baseball
4A State Champions – 1991, 1996 (43–0 record), 1998, 2003, 20195A state champions - 2013, 2014
Soccer
Basketball
4A State Champions – 2008 	
Softball
Slow Pitch 4A State Champions – 1989, 1990, 1997, 2000–2005, 2007, 2008ASA Slow Pitch 18U National Champions – 2005CheerleadersNational Champions – 20084A Mississippi State Champions – 2002, 2003, 2004,2006''	
American football 
Marching band

Gallery

References

External links
New Hope home page
Lowndes County School District
 Individual sports websites: soccer, basketball, American football

Public high schools in Mississippi
Schools in Lowndes County, Mississippi